Cokeville is a town in Lincoln County, Wyoming, United States. The population was 535 at the 2010 census. The town is best known for the Cokeville Elementary School hostage crisis.

History
The Shoshone Indians were the first inhabitants of the area. The first Euro-American settler, Tilford Kutch, arrived in 1869.  In 1873, he opened a trading post and ran a ferry across Smiths Fork. After the arrival of the railroad in 1882, the town grew, and was incorporated in 1910.

The town was named for the coal found in the area. Following the railroad, sheep ranching became more popular, reaching its peak in 1918, when Cokeville was informally called the "Sheep Capital of the World".

On May 16, 1986, former town marshal David Young and his wife Doris Young took 167 children and adults hostage at Cokeville Elementary School. During the Cokeville Elementary School hostage crisis. The children and adults escaped after the bomb exploded. Both hostage takers died, while 79 hostages were wounded.

Geography
Cokeville is located at  (42.084940, −110.955684).

Demographics

2010 census
As of the census of 2010, there were 535 people, 166 households, and 127 families residing in the town. The racial makeup of the town was 98.7% White, 0.4% Native American, 0.6% from other races, and 0.4% from two or more races. Hispanic or Latino of any race were 1.5% of the population.

There were 166 households, of which 45.8% had children under the age of 18 living with them, 69.3% were married couples living together, 6.0% had a female householder with no husband present, 1.2% had a male householder with no wife present, and 23.5% were non-families. 21.7% of all households were made up of individuals, and 9.6% had someone living alone who was 65 years of age or older. The average household size was 3.22 and the average family size was 3.87.

The median age in the town was 29.6 years. 41.5% of residents were under the age of 18; 4.7% were between the ages of 18 and 24; 21.1% were from 25 to 44; 21.7% were from 45 to 64; and 11% were 65 years of age or older. The gender makeup of the town was 51.4% male and 48.6% female.

2000 census
As of the census of 2000, there were 506 people, 166 households, and 125 families residing in the town. The population density was 693.2 people per square mile (267.6/km2). There were 195 housing units at an average density of 267.2 per square mile (103.1/km2). The racial makeup of the town was 95.83% White, 0.40% African American, 2.0% Pacific Islander, 0.99% from other races, and 0.79% from two or more races. Hispanic or Latino of any race were 2.37% of the population.

There were 166 households, out of which 37.3% had children under the age of 18 living with them, 69.3% were married couples living together, 4.8% had a female householder with no husband present, and 24.1% were non-families. 21.7% of all households were made up of individuals, and 9.0% had someone living alone who was 65 years of age or older. The average household size was 3.05 and the average family size was 3.66.

In the town, the population was spread out, with 37.0% under the age of 18, 8.3% from 18 to 24, 19.4% from 25 to 44, 21.1% from 45 to 64, and 14.2% who were 65 years of age or older. The median age was 31 years. For every 100 females, there were 103.2 males. For every 100 females age 18 and over, there were 98.1 males.

The median income for a household in the town was $31,705, and the median income for a family was $39,000. Males had a median income of $35,000 versus $22,083 for females. The per capita income for the town was $12,900. About 7.1% of families and 10.4% of the population were below the poverty line, including 15.9% of those under age 18 and none of those age 65 or over.

Education
Public education in the town of Cokeville is provided by Lincoln County School District #2. Zoned campuses include Cokeville Elementary School (grades K-6) and Cokeville High School (grades 7–12).

Cokeville has a public library, a branch of the Lincoln County Library System.

Infrastructure

Transportation by air
Cokeville Municipal Airport (U06) is an operational municipal airport serving the Town of Cokeville and surrounding areas. The airport is located on CR 207, and can be accessible by WYO 231, and from east of Laketown, Utah, by Manhead Road. It is owned by the town hall of Cokeville.

Transportation by road
 WYO 231 is a spur of US 30, and is the "main street" of Cokeville.
 US 30 is the only thoroughfare of the town, and provides access to Interstate 80 and nearby Idaho.
 WYO 232 branches off US 30 that serves a rural area northeast of Cokeville. If you went straight after US 30, you'll be on WYO 231.

Notable people
 Minerva Teichert (1888–1976), Western and LDS artist

See also

 List of municipalities in Wyoming

References

External links

Towns in Lincoln County, Wyoming
Towns in Wyoming
Populated places established in 1869
1869 establishments in Wyoming Territory